Dolores Gray (born Sylvia Dolores Finkelstein; June 7, 1924 – June 26, 2002) was an American actress and singer. She was nominated for the Tony Award for Best Lead Actress in a Musical twice, winning once.

Early life
She was born as Sylvia Dolores Finkelstein (but known by Sylvia Dolores Vernon growing up) to Barbara Marguerite Gray (born Marguerite Gray) and Harry Vernon Finkelstein. Both her mother and father were vaudeville actors, which is how they met.  Gray's parents divorced when she was a young child.  She had an older brother, Richard Gray (born Richard Vernon), who also had a career in Hollywood.  While attending Polytechnic High School she was in the Girls' Glee Club. She was discovered by Rudy Vallee, who gave her a guest spot on his nationwide radio show.

Career
Her career commenced as a cabaret artist in restaurants and supper clubs in San Francisco, and in Reno, Nevada. In 1945 she appeared in her own radio program. While she was appearing in Annie Get Your Gun in London (1947–1950), she studied at the Royal Academy of Dramatic Art in 1948. As a fundraiser to help rebuild the RADA theatre, she appeared as Nell Gwyn in In Good King Charles's Golden Days at  Drury Lane Theatre (Oct 1948). 

Gray was briefly signed with MGM, appearing in Kismet (1955), It's Always Fair Weather (1955) and The Opposite Sex (1956). 

Portraying a singing and dancing stage actress, she appeared with Gregory Peck and Lauren Bacall in the film Designing Woman (1957), as his former romantic interest. During her music career, she sang Marilyn Monroe's part on the Decca Records soundtrack album of There's No Business Like Show Business (1954).

She appeared at the London Palladium in 1958 while doing a concert tour of Europe and in cabaret at The Talk of the Town in February 1963.  Among her many stage roles, she appeared in Two on the Aisle (1951),  Carnival In Flanders (1953); Destry Rides Again (1959); Sherry! (1967); and 42nd Street (1986). She also performed the lead role in Annie Get Your Gun in its first London production (1947).  Gray won the Tony Award for Best Lead Actress in a Musical for her role in Carnival in Flanders, even though this Broadway musical, with a script by Preston Sturges, ran for only six performances. She therefore holds a record that is unlikely to be broken: briefest run in a performance which still earned a Tony. She is the first person to have sung the English version of the French song “C'est si bon”, for the short film Holiday in Paris: Paris directed by John Nasht. 

She was best known for her theatre roles. In 1973 she took over from Angela Lansbury in the London production of Gypsy at the Piccadilly Theatre. In 1987 she starred in the London production of Stephen Sondheim's Follies at the Shaftesbury Theatre to great acclaim and appeared in the Royal Variety Performance of that year with a show-stopping performance of the song
'I'm Still Here" from the show.  In 1978 she also appeared on BBC TV's long-running variety show The Good Old Days – chairman Leonard Sachs had also appeared in Follies as theatre owner Dimitri Wiseman, introducing Miss Gray, one of “The Wiseman Girls”.  Theatre critic Michael Phillips wrote that Gray's voice sounded like “a freight-train slathered in honey.” In 1988 she appeared in the Doctor Who 25th anniversary story “Silver Nemesis,” playing an American tourist.

Apart from the many soundtrack albums she appeared on, Gray recorded one album of songs in 1957 for Capitol Records with the title Warm Brandy (T897).

Marriage
On September 24, 1966, Dolores Gray married  Andrew J. Crevolin, a California businessman and Thoroughbred racehorse owner who won the 1954 Kentucky Derby. Despite erroneous reports in the media that they divorced, they remained married until his death in 1992. The couple had no children.

Death
Gray died of a heart attack in Manhattan, aged 78. Upon her death, she was cremated and her ashes interred at Holy Cross Cemetery in Culver City, California.

Filmography

Stage work
 Seven Lively Arts (1944)
 Are You With It? (1945)
 Sweet Bye and Bye (1946) (closed on the road)
 Annie Get Your Gun (1947; 1962)
 Two on the Aisle (1951)
 Pygmalion (1952) (summer theatre)
 Carnival in Flanders (1953)
 Can-Can (1957) (summer theatre)
 Silk Stockings (1958–59) (summer theatre)
 Destry Rides Again (1959)
 Lady in the Dark (1959) (summer theatre)
 Sherry! (1967)
 Gypsy (1973, 1976, 1982)
 All Dressed Up (1982)
 Going Hollywood (1983) (workshop)
 42nd Street (1986)
 Star Dust (1987) (concert reading)
 Follies (1987)
 Broadway at the Bowl (1988)

References

External links

 
 
 
  Dolores Gray Biography
 

Actresses from Chicago
Singers from Chicago
American film actresses
American television actresses
American musical theatre actresses
Tony Award winners
20th-century American actresses
1924 births
2002 deaths
Alumni of RADA
Burials at Holy Cross Cemetery, Culver City
Capitol Records artists
Decca Records artists
20th-century American singers
20th-century American women singers